Miss Grand Paraguay 2018 was the second edition of the Miss Grand Paraguay pageant, held on June 9, 2018, at the Theater of the Americas, Paraguayan-American Cultural Center (CCPA) in Asunción. Fifteen national delegates, either determined through the regional pageant or through central casting, competed for the right to represent the country at Miss Grand International 2018, of whom the representative of Asunción, Clara Sosa, was elected the winner. She then participated in the international contest in Myanmar, where she won the title, making her the first Paraguayan candidate to win the Miss Grand International pageant.

Results

Contestants
15 contestants competed for the title.

References

External links

 

Miss Grand Paraguay
Beauty pageants in Paraguay
Paraguayan awards
Grand Paraguay